Compsiluroides is a genus of flies in the family Tachinidae.

Species
C. communis Mesnil, 1953
C. flavipalpis Mesnil, 1957
C. proboscis Chao & Sun, 1992

References

Diptera of Asia
Exoristinae
Tachinidae genera